Octopus oculifer, also known as the Galápagos octopus, is a species of octopus endemic to the coast of the Galápagos, and has been identified in the  Revillagigedos ecoregion, living between 0-50 m deep.

References

Octopodidae
Molluscs described in 1904